The UGM-96 Trident I, or Trident C4, was an American submarine-launched ballistic missile (SLBM), built by Lockheed Martin Space Systems in Sunnyvale, California. First deployed in 1979, the Trident I replaced the Poseidon missile. It was retired in 2005, having been replaced by the Trident II.

The missile was a three-stage, solid-fuelled system, capable of carrying up to eight W76 warheads in the Mark 4 RB.

The first eight s were armed with Trident I missiles. Twelve - and s were also retrofitted with Trident I missiles, which replaced older Poseidon missiles.

In 1980, the Royal Navy requested Trident I missiles under the Polaris Sales Agreement. In 1982, the agreement was changed to supply Trident II instead.

See also
 Trident (missile)
 UGM-133 Trident II

References

Cold War weapons of the United States
Nuclear weapons of the United States
Cold War submarine-launched ballistic missiles of the United States
UGM-096
Military equipment introduced in the 1970s